Heysen is a single-member electoral district for the South Australian House of Assembly. It is named after Sir Hans Heysen, a prominent South Australian landscape artist. It is a 1,074 km² electoral district that takes in some of the outer southern suburbs of Adelaide before fanning south-east to include most of the Adelaide Hills, as well as farming areas some distance from the capital. It includes the localities of Aldgate, Ashbourne, Belvidere, Biggs Flat, Blackfellows Creek, Blewitt Springs, Bradbury, Bridgewater, Bugle Ranges, Bull Creek, Chapel Hill, Clarendon, Crafers, Dingabledinga, Dorset Vale, Echunga, Flaxley, Gemmells, Green Hills Range, Heathfield, Highland Valley, Hope Forest, Ironbank, Jupiter Creek, Kangarilla, Kuitpo, Kuitpo Colony, Kyeema, Longwood, Macclesfield, McHarg Creek, Meadows, Montarra, Mount Magnificent, Mylor, Paris Creek, Prospect Hill, Red Creek, Salem, Sandergrove, Scott Creek, Stirling, Strathalbyn, The Range, Willunga Hill, Willyaroo, Wistow, Woodchester, Yundi; as well as parts of Bletchley, Hartley, Onkaparinga Hills, Upper Sturt. Although geographically it is a hybrid urban-rural seat, it is counted as a metropolitan seat.

As Heysen combines both wealthier suburbs in the foothills of the Adelaide Hills and rural areas further east, it has been held by the Liberal Party and its predecessor, the Liberal and Country League, ever since its creation in the electoral redistribution of 1969 as a replacement for Stirling. For most of that time, it has been a fairly safe to safe seat for the conservatives. It was first contested at the 1970 election. It was abolished at the 1977 election, forcing then-member David Wotton to move to the seat of Murray.  However, Wotton returned to Heysen when it was re-established at the 1985 election. He subsequently held the seat until his retirement in 2002, when he was replaced by former opposition leader Isobel Redmond. Redmond retired at the 2018 election and was replaced by Josh Teague.

The 1997 election saw the Democrats receive 47.9 percent of the two-candidate preferred vote, the closest they had ever come to a seat any Australian lower house (apart from the South Australian seat of Mitcham). The 2002 election saw the Democrats receive 46 percent of the two-candidate preferred vote. The 2006 election saw their vote collapse with Labor being brought back into the two-candidate race. That election saw the seat turn marginal against Labor for the first time ever; the Liberals were cut down to 53 percent of the two-party vote. Out of 47 lower house seats, the SA Greens have consistently polled strongest in Heysen. Greens candidate Lynton Vonow came within a few percent of winning the overlapping federal seat of Mayo at the 2008 by-election. Vonow contested Heysen for the Greens at the 2014 election and overtook the Labor candidate coming second after preferences with a 39 percent two-candidate preferred vote from a 19.7 percent primary vote. The Greens also polled well in neighbouring seats such as Kavel and Davenport with primary votes over 15 percent. The 2018 election saw Nick Xenophon's SA-BEST receive 48.2 percent of the two-candidate preferred vote in Heysen which was the closest they came to winning a lower house seat.

At the 2022 state election, the Liberals fell to only 51 percent of the two-party vote amid their statewide collapse, only the second time the seat had been marginal against Labor.

Members for Heysen

Election results

Notes

References
 ECSA profile for Heysen: 2018
 ABC profile for Heysen: 2018
 Poll Bludger profile for Heysen: 2018

Electoral districts of South Australia
1970 establishments in Australia
1977 disestablishments in Australia
1985 establishments in Australia